The Sarasvati River was one of the Rigvedic rivers that played an important role in the Vedic religion. The river ran through the historical Kuru Kingdom in modern day Haryana, India.

Saraswati River may also refer to:
Ghaggar-Hakra River, the possible remains of the Sarasvati River in India and Pakistan
Saraswati River (Madhya Pradesh), India
Saraswati River (Uttarakhand), India
Saraswati River (Gujarat), India